Eric DeLony (1944–2018) served as chief of the Historic American Engineering Record (HAER) from 1971 to 2003 and was a noted historic preservationist. He was a professional engineering and industrial heritage consultant with a particular interest in the preservation of historic bridges. He received the General Tools Award, the highest award of the Society for Industrial Archeology, in 2000.

DeLony graduated from the Ohio State University in 1968.

Publications

References

Further reading

External links

Preservationist architects
Ohio State University alumni
Place of birth missing